A fallacy of division is an informal fallacy that occurs when one reasons that something that is true for a whole must also be true of all or some of its parts.

An example:

 The second grade in Jefferson Elementary eats a lot of ice cream
 Carlos is a second-grader in Jefferson Elementary
 Therefore, Carlos eats a lot of ice cream

The converse of this fallacy is called fallacy of composition, which arises when one fallaciously attributes a property of some part of a thing to the thing as a whole.

If a system as a whole has some property that none of its constituents has (or perhaps, it has it but not as a result of some constituent's having that property), this is sometimes called an emergent property of the system.

The term mereological fallacy refers to approximately the same incorrect inference that properties of a whole are also properties of its parts.

History 
Both the fallacy of division and the fallacy of composition were addressed by Aristotle in Sophistical Refutations.

In the philosophy of the ancient Greek Anaxagoras, as claimed by the Roman atomist Lucretius, it was assumed that the atoms constituting a substance must themselves have the salient observed properties of that substance: so atoms of water would be wet, atoms of iron would be hard, atoms of wool would be soft, etc. This doctrine is called homoeomeria, and it depends on the fallacy of division.

Examples in statistics

In statistics an ecological fallacy is a logical fallacy in the interpretation of statistical data where inferences about the nature of individuals are deduced from inference for the group to which those individuals belong. The four common statistical ecological fallacies are: confusion between ecological correlations and individual correlations, confusion between group average and total average, Simpson's paradox, and other statistical methods.

See also
 Ecological fallacy
 Fallacy of composition
 Synecdoche, the figure of speech of two forms: 
 Pars pro toto using the word for a part by way of referring to the whole
 Totum pro parte using the word for the whole by way of referring to a part

References

Further reading

External links

Division
Relevance fallacies
Emergence